The East Regional Hockey Association is the organising body for field hockey in the East of England. It feeds teams into the Men's and Women's England Hockey Leagues and takes teams from sub-regional leagues.

League structure
The men's and women's leagues both share a similar structure consisting of a Premier Division 1, with subsequent lower Premier divisions, followed by regional and sub-regional (county) divisions. The East Hockey Association covers nine counties.

Bedfordshire
Cambridgeshire
Essex
Hertfordshire
Kent (women only)
Lincolnshire (women only)
Norfolk
Suffolk

Recent champions

East Hockey League Premier Division

East Women's Hockey League Premier Division

References

Field hockey governing bodies in England
Field hockey leagues in England
Sport in Bedfordshire
Sport in Cambridgeshire
Sport in Cambridge
Sport in Essex
Sport in Hertfordshire
Sport in Kent
Sport in Canterbury
Sport in Lincolnshire
Field hockey in London
Sport in Norfolk
Sport in Norwich
Sport in Peterborough
Sport in Suffolk